Ricardo Tapia Acuña (27 September 1909 – 2 April 1996) was a Mexican tennis player.

The son of a doctor, Tapia was born in Mexico City and competed on the international tour in the 1920s and 1930s. After his tennis career he followed his father into medicine and was a noted otolaryngologist.

Tapia represented Mexico in the Davis Cup between 1928 and 1937, appearing in a total of eight ties. Often coming up against a strong United States team, he has the unenviable record of not registering a win from either his 15 singles rubbers or three doubles rubbers.

His sister María was Mexico's top women's player of her era.

See also
List of Mexico Davis Cup team representatives

References

External links
 
 
 

1909 births
1996 deaths
Mexican male tennis players
Central American and Caribbean Games medalists in tennis
Central American and Caribbean Games gold medalists for Mexico
Central American and Caribbean Games silver medalists for Mexico
Central American and Caribbean Games bronze medalists for Mexico
Competitors at the 1930 Central American and Caribbean Games
Competitors at the 1935 Central American and Caribbean Games
20th-century Mexican people